La Bajada is a census-designated place in Santa Fe County, New Mexico, United States. It is named after a geographical feature of the nearby Caja del Rio.

History
A post office called La Bajada was established in 1870, closed in 1872. La Bajada is derived from Spanish meaning "the descent".

Education
It is within Santa Fe Public Schools.

See also

References

External links

Census-designated places in Santa Fe County, New Mexico
Census-designated places in New Mexico